The Old and St Andrew's Church ('Auld Kirk') is a Church of Scotland church in Montrose, Angus. It was dedicated in 1793. The current steeple, designed by James Gillespie Graham, was completed in 1834.

References

External links
Church Timeline 

Category A listed buildings in Angus, Scotland
Listed churches in Scotland
Church of Scotland churches in Scotland
Churches in Angus, Scotland
1793 establishments in Scotland
18th-century Church of Scotland church buildings
Montrose, Angus